Pangodi is a village in Kambja Parish, Tartu County in eastern Estonia.

Pangodi is the birthplace of weightlifter Leonhard Kukk.

References

Villages in Tartu County
Kreis Dorpat